August Gottlieb Spangenberg (15 July 170418 September 1792) was a German theologian and minister, and a bishop of the Moravian Church. As successor of Count Nicolaus Zinzendorf, he helped develop international missions and stabilized the theology and organization of the German Moravian Church.

Early life and education
Spangenberg was born in Klettenberg, now a part of Hohenstein, Thuringia, where his father, Georg Spangenberg, was the pastor and ecclesiastical inspector. Left an orphan at the early age of thirteen, the young Spangenberg attended the gymnasium (secondary school) at Ilfeld. In 1722, he entered the University of Jena to study law. J. F. Buddeus, a professor, took him into his family and arranged a scholarship. Spangenberg soon abandoned law for theology, obtaining his degree in 1726 and began to giving free lectures on theology.

Career
Spangenberg took an active part in a religious union of students, supporting free schools for poor children established in the suburbs of Jena and in training teachers. In 1728, Count Zinzendorf visited Jena, and Spangenberg met him. In 1730, Spangenberg visited the Moravian colony at Herrnhut and founded a "collegium pastorale practicum" for the care of the sick and poor at Jena, which the authorities broke up as a "Zinzendorfian institution", seen as a challenge to the state. Spangenberg visited the Moravian colony, whose approach appealed to him.

Meanwhile, his free lectures in Jena were widely accepted. Gotthilf Francke offered him the post of assistant professor of theology and superintendent of schools connected with his orphanage at Halle. He accepted the offer in September 1732. But differences between the pietists of Halle and Spangenberg emerged with Sangenberg finding their religious life too formal, external and worldly. The pietists could not sanction his comparative indifference to doctrine and his tendency to separatism in church life. 

Spangenberg's decision to take part in private observances of the Lord's Supper and his connection with Count Zinzendorf brought matters to a crisis. The Senate of the Theological Faculty gave him the alternative of doing penance, submitting to his superiors, and separating from Zinzendorf, or leaving the issue to be settled by the king unless he preferred to "leave Halle quietly." The case went to the king, who ordered the military to expel Spangenberg from Halle, which they did on April 8, 1733.

At first Spangenberg went to Jena, but Zinzendorf sought to secure him as a fellow labourer, though the count wished to obtain from him a declaration which would remove from the Pietists of Halle all blame with regard to the disruption. Spangenberg went to Herrnhut and found his life work among the Moravians. He became the movement's theologian, apologist, statesman and corrector over a lengthy sixty-year career.  The Moravians universally referred to Spangenberg as "Brother Joseph" because, like Joseph in Genesis, he took care of his Brethren.

For the first thirty years (1733-1762), his work was mainly devoted to the supervision and organization of the extensive missions in Germany, England, Denmark, the Netherlands, Suriname, Georgia and elsewhere.  One special endeavor of Spangenberg in Pennsylvania in the United States was designed to bring the scattered Schwenkfeldians into the Moravian faith. In 1741-1742, he traveled to England to raise funds for his mission and obtain the sanction of the Archbishop of Canterbury.

During the second half of this missionary period of his life, Spangenberg went to Pennsylvania, where as bishop he supervised the Moravian churches.  He helped raise money to defend the colonies during the Seven Years' War.  In addition, he wrote as an apologist of the Church against the attacks of the Lutherans and the Pietists. He did much to moderate the mysticism of Zinzendorf, bringing a simple, practical nature to his theological work. In 1761, Spangenberg visited Emmaus, Pennsylvania, which was then a leading Moravian community, announcing the town's new name as Emmaus and saying, "Now here we build a village small; toward its completion we give all. Here, too, our hearts within shall flame; Emmaus then shall be its name.". 

The second thirty years of his work (1762-1792) were devoted to the consolidation of the German Moravian Church.  Zinzendorf's death (1760) called for Spangenberg to return to Herrnhut. The Moravian organization needed help. In 1777, Spangenberg was commissioned to draw up the Idea Fidei Fratrum (a compendium of the Christian faith of the United Brethren).  This became the accepted declaration of the Moravian belief.  As compared to Zinzendorf's writings, this book exhibits the balance and moderation that Spangenberg expressed.

The Idea Fidei Fratrum is an account of doctrine that keeps close to the words of Scripture. There is little in it of abstract theological reasoning. Spangenberg does make his views plain on certain controversial matters. One of these, for instance, is on the question of double predestination, i.e., to damnation as well as salvation. 
"If we sum up that which hath been deduced from the Scripture concerning the Father, Son and Holy Ghost, we may answer the question, Whether God would have all men to be saved? with a confident, Yes. There is in him the most fervent desire, and the most earnest will that we all should be saved."

He provides numerous texts to justify this position. He notes further that the Savior suffered the loss of glory and the pains of human life and death in order to save all people.  Secondly, the Holy Ghost makes unwearyingly efforts to reprove the worldly for their sin. "Would God command all men every where to repent, and yet would not, that all men should be saved? Who can form such a thought of the God of Holiness and Truth?"

In his last years, Spangenberg devoted special attention to the education of the young. He died at Berthelsdorf on September 18, 1792 and was buried in the God's Acre in Herrnhut.

Works
 Idea fidei fratrum (Barby, 1782; translated into English by La Trobe under the title Exposition of Christian Doctrine, London, 1784)
 Declaration über die seither gegen uns ausgegangenen Beschuldigungen sonderlich die Person unseres Ordinarius (Zinzendorf) betreffend, a polemical work in defence of Zinzendorf (Leipzig, 1751)
 Apologetische Schlußschrift, a polemical work in defence of Zinzendorf (1752)
 Leben des Grafen Zinzendorf (3 vols., Barby, 1772-1774; abridged English translation, London, 1838)
 numerous hymns.

Notes

References
  This work in turn cites:
 Selbstbiographie (autobiography)
 J. Risler, Leben Spangenbergs (Barby, 1794)
 K. F. Ledderhose, Das Leben Spangenbergs (Heidelberg, 1846)
 Otto Frick, Beiträge zur Lebensgeschichte A.G. Spangenbergs (Halle, 1884)
 Gerhard Reichel (1906) “Spangenberg” in Herzog-Hauck's Realencyklopädie
 

1704 births
1792 deaths
Emmaus, Pennsylvania
People from Nordhausen (district)
Writers of the Moravian Church
Moravian Church missionaries
18th-century Moravian bishops
University of Jena alumni
German Protestant missionaries